The Last Command is the second studio album by the American heavy metal band W.A.S.P., released on October 25, 1985. The album was produced by Spencer Proffer, who was perhaps best known for producing the six-time Platinum selling album Metal Health by Quiet Riot in 1983.

The song "Running Wild in the Streets" was originally written by Proffer and demoed by Spectre General a.k.a. Kick Axe and Black Sabbath with Ron Keel before release on this album. "Sex Drive" was originally written by Blackie Lawless and Randy Piper's previous band Sister. "Cries in the Night" is based on a song called "Mr. Cool", released on a 1976 single by the Killer Kane Band where Blackie was a member at the time.

The Last Command is the first W.A.S.P. album to feature the work of drummer Steve Riley and the last album to feature founding member Randy Piper on guitar. The album reached No. 49 on the Billboard 200 album chart in early 1986 and sold over one million copies, their first album to do so.

Track listing

Personnel
W.A.S.P.
 Blackie Lawless – lead vocals, bass guitar
 Chris Holmes – lead & rhythm guitars
 Randy Piper – lead & rhythm guitars, backing vocals
 Steve Riley – drums, backing vocals

Additional musicians
Carlos Cavazo, Chuck Wright – Backing vocals on "Running Wild in the Streets"

Production
Spencer Proffer – producer, engineer 
Suzanna DuBarry – producer assistant
Hanspeter Huber – engineer
Alex Woltman, Kevin Arnst – assistant engineers
Steve Hall – mastering at Future Disc, Hollywood
Mark Weiss – photography

Charts

Album

Singles

Certifications

References

W.A.S.P. albums
1985 albums
Capitol Records albums
Albums produced by Spencer Proffer